David Fine may refer to:

 David Fine (activist) (born 1952), American activist
 David Fine (filmmaker) (born 1960), Canadian filmmaker